Needham is an English surname. Notable people with the surname include:

Alicia Adélaide Needham (1863–1945), Irish composer
Arthur Needham (1859–1915), Washington State pioneer 
Ben Needham, British infant missing since 1991
Col Needham, co-founder of the Internet Movie Database
David Needham, English football player
Elizabeth Needham, English procuress and brothel-keeper of 18th-century London
Ernest Needham (1873–1936), English football player
Francis Needham, 3rd Earl of Kilmorey (1842–1915), 3rd Earl of Kilmorey
Sir Frederick Needham (1835–1924), English physician 
George Carter Needham (1840–1902), American writer and namesake of the needham
Hal Needham, American stuntman
Henry Needham (1876–1965), British Major-General and staff officer
Jack Needham, English football player
 James Needham (1849–1913), English mycologist
James George Needham (1868–1957), American entomologist
Jimmy Needham (born 1985), American contemporary Christian singer songwriter and musician
John Needham (1713–1781), British biologist and Roman Catholic priest who believed in the theory of spontaneous generation
Joseph Needham (1900–1995), British biochemist and sinologist
Marchamont Needham, English political pamphleteer 
Nik Needham (born 1996), American football player
Richard Needham, 6th Earl of Kilmorey (born 1942), British politician
Richard J. Needham (1912–1996), Canadian newspaper columnist and humorist
Rodney Needham (1923–2006), British social anthropologist
Roger Needham, British computer scientist
Samuel Needham VC, British soldier 
T. Needham, English cricketer
Tom Needham, Irish baseball player
Tracey Needham, American actress
Tristan Needham, British mathematician
Violet Needham, British author

English-language surnames